Karlijn is a Dutch feminine given name that is a diminutive form of Carolina and Caroline. Notable people with the name include:

Karlijn Demasure (born 1955), Belgian professor of theology
Karlijn Swinkels (born 1998), Dutch cyclist

See also

Carlijn
Karlin (surname)

Notes

Dutch feminine given names